Nelli Nailevna Zhiganshina (born 31 March 1987) is a Russian-born German ice dancer. With Alexander Gazsi, she is a six-time German national champion (2007, 2011–2015) and has won twelve international medals. They have placed as high as 6th at the European Championships and 10th at the World Championships.

Personal life 
Nelli Zhiganshina was born on 31 March 1987 in Moscow. She is the elder sister of Ruslan Zhiganshin, who is a competitive ice dancer for Russia. Their mother is a children's skating coach.

Zhiganshina passed a German citizenship test in 2011 and filed documents to renounce her Russian citizenship, as required by Germany. In November 2013, it was announced that she had been released by Russia, allowing her to take German citizenship.

Career

Early years 
Zhiganshina began skating in 1990 at the age of three. She took up ice dancing at 12. Zhiganshina competed with Denis Bazdirev for Russia until the end of 2004, appearing four times on the ISU Junior Grand Prix series.

Partnership with Alexander Gazsi

2005–2010 
In June 2005, Zhiganshina had a tryout with Alexander Gazsi in Moscow and agreed to skate with him for Germany. At the start of their partnership, they trained mainly in Moscow with coaches Elena Kustarova and Svetlana Alexeeva and, during summers, in Berlin and Chemnitz due to Gazsi's army service. They later changed coaches to Alexander Zhulin and Oleg Volkov, also in Moscow.

Zhiganshina/Gazsi won bronze at their first German Championships in 2006, their only competition of the season. The next season they won their first national title, placed 16th at the 2007 Europeans and 18th at Worlds.

During the 2007–08 season, they made their debut on the Grand Prix circuit, placing 7th at Skate Canada and 8th at Cup of Russia. They won silver at German Nationals and again finished 18th at Worlds.

During the 2008–09 season, Zhiganshina/Gazsi did not compete on the Grand Prix circuit. Zhiganshina continued to visit Germany on a three-month tourist visa because the low income from the sport meant she did not qualify for residency and Germany did not have as high caliber ice dancers as Moscow to train alongside. Although favored to win 2009 German Nationals, they placed second and missed the European and World teams. They considered leaving competition to focus on show skating and worked with circus acrobats in Moscow but decided to continue their competitive career and moved to Oberstdorf, Germany in spring 2009 to work with coaches Rostislav Sinicyn and Martin Skotnicky. During the 2009–10 season, they placed third at German Nationals and were not sent to the European or World Championships. They were not eligible for the 2010 Winter Olympics due to Zhiganshina not having German citizenship.

2010–present 

During the 2010–11 season, Zhiganshina/Gazsi again received no Grand Prix invitations but won three medals at senior B events. They won their second national title and were selected to compete at the European Championships for the first time in three years. At Europeans, they were 8th in the short dance, then edged past Nóra Hoffmann / Maxim Zavozin by 0.39 points into 7th place overall after the free dance. This was the first top-ten result for German ice dancers since 2003 (Kati Winkler / Rene Lohse). The result gave Germany two berths to the 2012 European ice dancing event. Zhiganshina/Gazsi finished 11th at the 2011 World Championships, earning invitations to two Grand Prix events the following season.

In preparation for the 2011–12 season, Zhiganshina/Gazsi went to Sofia, Bulgaria, to work with choreographer Maxim Staviski, with whom they also worked in previous years. They began their season at the 2011 Nebelhorn Trophy where they won the silver medal. After placing fourth at both of their Grand Prix events, the 2011 Skate America and 2011 NHK Trophy, the duo finished eighth at the 2012 European Championships and eleventh at the 2012 World Championships.

In 2012–13, Zhiganshina/Gazsi placed a career-best sixth at the 2013 European Championships and tenth at the 2013 World Championships. As a result of their Worlds placement, Germany qualified two spots in ice dancing at the 2014 Olympics.

In 2013–14, Zhiganshina/Gazsi won their fifth national title and were selected to represent Germany at the 2014 Winter Olympics in Sochi. Germany assigned them to the team event short dance, where they placed sixth; Germany, however, did not qualify for the free dance. Zhiganshina/Gazsi finished 11th in the separate ice dancing event.

Programs 
(with Gazsi)

Competitive highlights 
GP: Grand Prix; CS: Challenger Series (began in the 2014–15 season); JGP: Junior Grand Prix

With Gazsi for Germany

With Bazdirev for Russia

References

External links 

 
 

1987 births
Living people
German female ice dancers
German people of Russian descent
Russian expatriate sportspeople in Germany
Figure skaters from Moscow
Figure skaters at the 2014 Winter Olympics
Olympic figure skaters of Germany
Naturalized citizens of Germany